Events in the year 1996 in Namibia.

Incumbents 

 President: Sam Nujoma
 Prime Minister: Hage Geingob
 Chief Justice of Namibia: Ismael Mahomed

Events 

 19 July – 4 August – The country competed at the 1996 Summer Olympics in Atlanta, United States, with runner Frankie Fredericks winning 2 silver medals.

Deaths

References 

 
1990s in Namibia
Years of the 20th century in Namibia
Namibia
Namibia